Christopher S. Axworthy,  (born March 10, 1947, Plymouth, United Kingdom) is a Canadian politician and academic.

Law Professor 
After teaching law at the University of New Brunswick and Dalhousie Law School, Chris Axworthy came to Saskatoon in 1984 as the founding executive director of the Centre for the Study of Co-operatives and as a professor of law at the University of Saskatchewan. In 2003 he returned to the University of Saskatchewan as a professor of law, where he taught until the spring of 2008.

In the spring of 2008, he was appointed as Dean of Robson Hall (Faculty of Law - University of Manitoba) for a five-year term beginning on July 1, 2008.  He is also the President of the Institute of Parliamentary and Political Law.

In May 2010, Axworthy assumed the position as the Founding Dean of Law at Thompson Rivers University's new law school, which opened in Fall 2011.  On July 15, 2013, he resigned this position.

Political career
He was elected as a Saskatchewan Member of Parliament for the New Democratic Party in 1988 and was re-elected in 1993 and 1997.

He resigned from the House of Commons on June 1, 1999, to join the cabinet of then Saskatchewan Premier Roy Romanow. He was elected as an MLA in a by-election as the Saskatchewan NDP MLA for the constituency of Saskatoon-Fairview with 64% of the vote. He was also reelected three months later in a general election that same year. He served as Attorney General and Minister of Justice, Minister of Aboriginal Affairs and Minister of Intergovernmental Affairs. After Romanow stepped down, Axworthy ran against Lorne Calvert for the provincial NDP leadership convention and finished second.

Although he was an NDP member for his political career, he announced his bid for the Liberal nomination in the riding of Saskatoon—Wanuskewin on March 5, 2004. He received 32.58% of the vote, but lost to incumbent Conservative MP, Maurice Vellacott. He lost to Vellacott a second time in the 2006 federal election.

References

External links
 Canadian parliamentary profile
 
 University of Manitoba profile

1947 births
21st-century Canadian politicians
Living people
Dalhousie University alumni
Members of the House of Commons of Canada from Saskatchewan
New Democratic Party MPs
British emigrants to Canada
Politicians from Saskatoon
Saskatchewan New Democratic Party MLAs
Members of the Executive Council of Saskatchewan
Academic staff of the University of Manitoba
Academic staff of the University of Saskatchewan
Attorneys-General of Saskatchewan
Canadian King's Counsel